Krasnodon (Ukrainian, Russian: Краснодон) is a city in Luhansk Oblast (region) of eastern Ukraine. It is incorporated as a city of oblast significance and serves as the administrative center of Krasnodon Raion (district), though it does not belong to the raion.

Population of Krasnodon in 1972 was 70,400, in 1989 it was around 53,000, in 2001 it was 49,921.

Krasnodon came under control of pro-Russian separatists in early 2014, and was incorporated into the Lugansk People's Republic. In 2016 the city was renamed by Ukraine Sorokyne as part of decommunization in Ukraine. However, the name change has had limited effect due to Ukraine not controlling the city. After the 2022 annexation referendums in Russian-occupied Ukraine, Russia claimed the city as part of Russia. 

In 2016 the city was renamed Sorokyne as part of decommunization in Ukraine. The city's name change has been largely symbolic as it is not controlled by the government of Ukraine.

History
Krasnodon was established in 1914 along the banks of the Velyka Kamianka, a tributary of the Donets River, as the settlement of Sorokyne. It soon became one of the centers of the coal mining industry of the Donbas region. By the Decision of the Presidium of the Supreme Soviet of the USSR, on 28 October 1938 it was renamed to Krasnodon.

A local newspaper is published in the city since September 1930.

During the German-Soviet War, Krasnodon was occupied by Nazi Germany from July 20, 1942 to February 14, 1943. The Germans operated a Nazi prison in the town. The Soviet Komsomol organization resistance Young Guard operated in the city from October 1942 to January 1943, when most of its members were arrested and executed. The Young Guard are commemorated with monuments and a memorial complex in Krasnodon.

Since 2014, Krasnodon has been controlled by the Luhansk People's Republic and not the Ukrainian authorities. NATO released satellite data from 21 August 2014 and confirmed it showed a large column of armoured vehicles crossing into Ukraine from Russia through Krasnodon.

Demographics
As of the Ukrainian Census of 2001:

 Ethnicity
 Russians: 63.3%
 Ukrainians: 33.2%
 Belarusians: 1.3%
 Other: 2.2%

Language
Russian: 90.75%
Ukrainian: 8.46%
Romani: 0.17%
Armenian: 0.15%
Belarusian: 0.12%

Gallery

See also
Oleg Koshevoy
Ivan Turkenich

External links
  Official city page

References

 
Cities in Luhansk Oblast
Populated places established in 1914
Cities of regional significance in Ukraine
Populated places established in the Russian Empire
City name changes in Ukraine